KDHT may refer to:

 KDHT (FM), a radio station (95.7 FM) licensed to serve Denver, Colorado, United States.
 KRCB-FM, a radio station (104.9 FM) licensed to serve Rohnert Park, California, United States, which held the call sign KDHT from 2017 to 2021
 KFCO, a radio station (107.1 FM) licensed to serve Bennett, Colorado, United States, which held the call sign KDHT-FM from 2009 to 2014
 KGSR, a radio station (93.3 FM) licensed to serve Cedar Park, Texas, United States, which held the call sign KDHT from 2003 to 2009
 The ICAO code for Dalhart Municipal Airport
 The NOAA code for Dalhart Municipal Airport weather station